Rodrigo Andrés Izquierdo Díaz (born 19 November 1992) is a Uruguayan footballer who plays as a right back for CA Cerro of the Uruguayan Primera División.

Career statistics

Club

Notes

References

1992 births
Living people
People from Canelones Department
Uruguayan footballers
Uruguayan expatriate footballers
C.A. Cerro players
Club Atlético Zacatepec players
Uruguayan Primera División players
Ascenso MX players
Uruguayan expatriate sportspeople in Mexico
Expatriate footballers in Mexico
Association football midfielders